Luis Vicente Jerez Silva (born 20 February 1989) is an Argentine professional footballer who plays as a central midfielder for Almagro.

Career
Jerez Silva's footballing career began with Primera B Nacional's Defensa y Justicia. He played seventy-three times and scored three goals between January 2010 and May 2012, with his debut coming on 30 January in a defeat to Tiro Federal. Four games after his debut, on 27 February 2010, he scored his first career goal against Ferro Carril Oeste. In July 2012, Jerez Silva joined Argentine Primera División side Godoy Cruz. His first appearance for the club came in a 2–1 loss away to Vélez Sarsfield on 9 November. In all competitions, he scored one goal in thirty-eight matches before leaving on loan in 2016.

He joined Talleres on loan in January 2016. Twenty appearances and one goal followed for Jerez Silva with Talleres as they won the 2016 Primera B Nacional title. On 30 June 2016, Jerez Silva rejoined former club Defensa y Justicia on a temporary basis. His second debut for the club arrived on 27 August in a goalless tie with Rosario Central. Jerez Silva made a move to Mexican football in July 2018 by signing for Dorados de Sinaloa of Ascenso MX. Having spent a season in Mexico, Jerez Silva agreed a return to his homeland on 20 June 2019 after penning terms with San Martín.

After one goal in nineteen total matches for El Verdinegro, Jerez Silva joined fellow Primera B Nacional team Almagro in August 2020.

Career statistics
.

Honours
Talleres
Primera B Nacional: 2016

References

External links

1989 births
Living people
Footballers from La Plata
Argentine footballers
Association football midfielders
Argentine expatriate footballers
Expatriate footballers in Mexico
Argentine expatriate sportspeople in Mexico
Primera Nacional players
Argentine Primera División players
Ascenso MX players
Defensa y Justicia footballers
Godoy Cruz Antonio Tomba footballers
Talleres de Córdoba footballers
Dorados de Sinaloa footballers
San Martín de San Juan footballers
Club Almagro players